The 1980s was the second decade in the industry's history. It was a decade of highs and lows for video games. The decade began amidst a boom in the arcade business with giants like Atari still dominating the American market since the late-1970s. Another, the rising influence of the home computer, and a lack of quality in the games themselves led to an implosion of the video game market that nearly destroyed the industry in North America. It took home consoles years to recover from the crash, but Nintendo filled in the void with its Nintendo Entertainment System (NES, Famicom), reviving interest in consoles. Up until this point, most investors believed video games to be a fad that has since passed. In the remaining years of the decade, Sega ignites a console war with Nintendo, developers that had been affected by the crash experimented with the more advanced graphics of the PC, and Nintendo released the Game Boy, which would become the best-selling handheld gaming device for the next two-decades. Other consoles releases in the decade included the Intellivision, TurboGrafx-16 (PC Engine) and Sega Genesis (Mega Drive). Notable games of the 1980s included Metroid, Elite, SimCity, Ninja Gaiden, Tetris, Pac-Man, Contra, Donkey Kong, and the first five Super Mario games.

Consoles of the 1980s

Third generation consoles (1983–1993) 

Starting in 1983 the third generation began with the Japanese release of the Family Computer (or "Famicom"; later known as the Nintendo Entertainment System in the rest of the world) by Nintendo. Although the previous generation of consoles had also used 8-bit processors, it was at the end of this generation that home consoles were first labeled by their "bits". This also came into fashion as 16-bit systems like Sega's Genesis were marketed to differentiate between the generations of consoles. In the United States, this generation in gaming was primarily dominated by the NES/Famicom. Other notable consoles included Sega's Mark III, also known as the Master System.

Early Fourth generation consoles (1987–1996) 

Starting in 1987 with the PC Engine in Japan and ending in 1996, with the last console being the Neo-Geo in 1991, the fourth generation of video game consoles consisted primarily of games and systems programmed for the 16-bit era. During this generation, 2D graphics had improved over the previous generation and experimentation began to occur with 3D graphics, although 3D games were more prevalent on the PC at the time. The fourth generation also was the first time compact discs were considered a viable port for video game retail sales with the CD-i. Some of the most notable systems released during this generation were the Super Famicom/Super Nintendo Entertainment System (1990), the Sega Mega Drive/Genesis (1988), and the Neo Geo (1991). Nintendo's Game Boy was also released during the fourth generation, which would later become the most popular series of handheld gaming systems during the 1990s. A rivalry between Sega and Nintendo occurred during this generation, starting the first ever console war.

History

Golden age of arcade games

In the early-1980s, arcade games were a vibrant industry. The arcade video game industry in the US alone was generating $5 billion of revenue annually in 1981 and the number of arcades doubled between 1980 and 1982. The effect video games had on society expanded to other mediums as well such as major films and music. In 1982, "Pac-Man Fever" charted on the Billboard Hot 100 charts and Tron became a cult classic.

Third-party development and an oversaturated market 
Following a dispute over recognition and royalties, several of Atari's key programmers split and founded their own company Activision in late 1979. Activision was the first third-party developer for the Atari 2600. Atari sued Activision for copyright infringement and theft of trade secrets in 1980, but the two parties settled on fixed royalty rates and a legitimizing process for third parties to develop games on hardware.

In the aftermath of the lawsuit, an oversaturated market resulted in companies that had never had an interest in video games before beginning to work on their own promotional games; brands like Purina Dog Food. The market was also flooded with too many consoles and too many poor quality games, elements that would contribute to the collapse of the entire video game industry in 1983.

Video game crash of 1983 

By 1983, the video game bubble created during the golden age had burst and several major companies that produced computers and consoles had gone into bankruptcy. Atari reported a $536 million loss in 1983. Some entertainment experts and investors lost confidence in the medium and believed it was a passing fad. A game often given poster child status to this era, E.T. the Extra-Terrestrial had such bad sale figures that the remaining unsold cartridges were buried in the deserts of New Mexico.

Rise of computer gaming 
The brunt of the crash was felt mainly across the home console market. Home computer gaming continued to thrive in this time period, especially with lower-cost machines such as the Commodore 64 and ZX Spectrum. Some computer companies adopted aggressive advertising strategies to compete with gaming consoles and to promote their educational appeal to parents as well. Home computers also allowed motivated users to develop their own games, and many notable titles were created this way, such as Jordan Mechner's Karateka, which he wrote on an Apple II while in college.

In the late 1980s, IBM PC compatibles became popular as gaming devices, with more memory and higher resolutions than consoles, but lacking in the custom hardware that allowed the slower console systems to create smooth visuals.

Rejuvenation 
By 1985, the home market console in North America had been dormant for nearly two years. Elsewhere, video games continued to be a staple of innovation and development. After seeing impressive numbers from its Famicom system in Japan, Nintendo decided to jump into the North American market by releasing the Nintendo Entertainment System, or NES for short. After release it took several years to build up momentum, but despite the pessimism of critics it became a success. Nintendo is credited with reviving the home console market.

One innovation that led to Nintendo's success was its ability to tell stories on an inexpensive home console; something that was more common for home computer games, but had only been seen on consoles in a limited fashion. Nintendo also took measures to prevent another crash by requiring third-party developers to adhere to regulations and standards, something that has existed on major consoles since then. One requirement was a "lock and key" system to prevent reverse engineering. It also forced third parties to pay in full for their cartridges before release, so that in case of a flop, the liability will be on the developer and not the provider.

Notable video-game franchises established in the 1980s

Arcades

Consoles and home computers 

Notes:
 Game franchises that also accompany major film or television franchises.
 Game franchises that are considered spin-offs of previously established franchises.

Financial performance

Highest-grossing arcade games of the decade 

The following titles were the highest-grossing arcade video games of each year in the 1980s, in terms of coin drop earnings.

Best-selling home video games of the decade 
The following table lists the top 20 best-selling home video games of the 1980s. Note that video game sales numbers were not as widely reported during the 1980s, with the exception of titles published by Nintendo and Atari, Inc.

Best-selling home systems of the decade 
The following table lists the top 20 best-selling home systems in the 1980s, including home video game consoles, handheld game consoles, handheld electronic games, and personal computers.

Hardware timeline 
The following gallery highlights hardware used to predominantly play games throughout the 1980s.

Notes

References 

 
 
video games
Video games by decade
1980s decade overviews